Kilcohan Park Greyhound Stadium is a greyhound racing track and former soccer stadium located in the south of Waterford, Ireland.

Operations
Racing takes place every Friday and Saturday evening. Race distances are 325, 525, 550, 575 and 731 yards  and the feature event at the track is the Gain Feeds Select Stakes.

The main event held at the track is the Gain Feeds Select Stakes which for many years was known as the Waterford Glass Stakes.

Facilities include a restaurant, fast food facilities, a number of bars and totalisator betting. 

The stadium is near Waterford city, and has a large customer car park.

History
Originally built as a Soccer stadium for Waterford Football Club, opening on 2 November 1930 and unlicensed greyhound racing. It was owned by Mr J.McGrath and agreement was reached with Mr J.Mulhall, the president of the Irish Coursing Club (ICC) for the track to be run by them and under ICC rules in 1947. It staged its first meeting during May 1947 under ICC rules and is one of the Ireland's smallest provincial tracks but still has a circumference of 460 yards. 

In September 1978 a new restaurant was built by the owners the Waterford Greyhound Racing Company and overseen by Racing Manager Paddy Grant. The track managed to survive despite the large scale redundancies at the nearby Waterford Glass works in the late eighties. Waterford United Football Club remained at the stadium until 1993 and European Cup matches were held at this venue before the club moved grounds. 

Greyhound Racing Ireland took over the venue and invested in improvements in 2002, with a major facelift throughout the stadium and on the track. In 2006 a €3.5m extension featuring a new 180-seated restaurant and bar bringing the facilities up to a very high standard.

Competitions
 Select Stakes

Track records
Current
  

Former

References

Greyhound racing venues in the Republic of Ireland
Defunct association football venues in the Republic of Ireland
Buildings and structures in Waterford (city)
Sport in Waterford (city)